Métascouac can refer to:

 Métascouac Lake, lake in Lac-Jacques-Cartier, Quebec, Canada
 Petit lac Métascouac, lake in Lac-Croche, Quebec, Canada
 Métascouac River, a tributary of Métabetchouane River in Quebec, Canada
 Métascouac South River, river in Lac-Croche, Quebec, Canada